Mobil 1 is a brand of synthetic motor oil and other automotive lubrication products. Originally developed by the Mobil oil company, it is now globally marketed and sold by ExxonMobil.

Mobil 1 engine oil was introduced in 1974. The brand range now includes a variety of engine oils, oil filters, chassis grease, transmission fluids, and gear lubricants.

In 1998, Mobil sued(there was no lawsuit) Castrol over the discovery that Castrol was processing conventional oil and calling it synthetic. At the time, Mobil 1 was still created using a true synthetic basestock, which is more expensive. Mobil lost the advertising "complaint", and, as a result, the definition of 'synthetic oil' including GroupIII heavily refined to the point of considering it synthetic. In response, Mobil downgraded their process to the less expensive process which is not true. The result is a hydrocracked, hydroisomerized XVHI oil. Lubes N' Greases magazine has reported shortcomings in the ability to pass the tests that the original Mobil 1 formula was able to, but no one remembers those tests.

Sponsorships

Formula One team Williams had Mobil sponsorship from 1978 to 1988, as well as 2009. In 1987 it switched to Benetton, until 1992. Team Lotus also used Mobil 1 in 1994. From 1995 until 2016, Mobil 1 sponsored McLaren for motor oil and other fluid components. Mobil 1 was also lubricants supplier for Toyota F1 team in 2007 until 2009 when Mobil took over Esso and Exxon lubricants' productions, Brawn GP in 2009 and also Force India in 2009 until 2013. In 2017, Mobil 1 switched to Red Bull Racing and its sister team, Scuderia Toro Rosso, that lasted only for 2017 season.

NASCAR Cup Series driver Rusty Wallace was sponsored by Mobil from 1987. In 1991, he carried his sponsorship to Penske Racing. Jeremy Mayfield had Mobil as the primary sponsorship in 1998, and later Ryan Newman and Sam Hornish Jr. took it as well. Penske's IndyCar operations also had Mobil 1 sponsorship from 1991, until the deal was ended after the 2010 season. Since 2011, Stewart-Haas Racing has carried the Mobil 1 sponsorship among their various teams. Toyota Racing Development-supported NASCAR teams also use Mobil oil.

Mobil 1 was a lubricants supplier of DTM team Mercedes-AMG from 1995 until 2010. It supports Porsche and Corvette sports car programs as lubricants provider since 1996. The Bentley Continental GT3 factory cars are also sponsored by Mobil 1 since 2013.

Mobil 1 currently providing sponsorship for Lexus-backed 3GT Racing since 2017 season. In motorcycle racing, Mobil 1 also provided lubricants for Spanish MotoGP team Pons Racing in the 2002 and 2003 seasons.

Mobil, from 1985 to 1993, was title sponsor of Peter Brock's Holden Dealer Team and Advantage Racing that competed in the Australian Touring Car Championship and in the 1986 European Touring Car Championship. Brock, from 1985 until his death in 2006, appeared in advertising for Mobil 1, including an international campaign that ran in the United States in 2000. Since 1994, Mobil has been a sponsor of Supercars team Walkinshaw Andretti United.

As well as sponsoring teams, the brand sponsored the German Grand Prix from 1987 to 2006 and the French Grand Prix from 1998 to 2004 . Since 2003, Mobil 1 has been the official sponsor of NASCAR and sponsors the Command Performance Award, which pays a monetary bonus to the highest-finishing Mobil 1 using team. Since 2002, it has been the title sponsor of the 12 Hours of Sebring. Since 2008, it has been the title sponsor of the Porsche Supercup.

In 2001, Mobil 1 became the primary jersey sponsor of French Ligue 1 football side Sochaux, which was founded and is owned by the Montbéliard-based Peugeot automobile manufacturers. Sochaux has alternated in recent seasons between wearing partner brands Esso and Mobil 1 across the chest of their jerseys, favoring the latter for their 2012-13 Ligue 1 campaign.

From 2023 season onwards, Mobil 1 will partner Red Bull KTM Factory Racing MotoGP team as an official lubricant partner and supplier.

References

External links
 

Products introduced in 1974
American brands
ExxonMobil brands
Motor oils